The Complete Recordings is a compilation album for Oh-OK released by Collector's Choice Music on June 24, 2002. The compilation includes all of the band's previous releases as well as a live set from 1984—shortly before the group broke up.

Track listing 
Wow Mini Album
 "Lilting" (Lynda Stipe) – 1:03
 "Brother" (Carol Levy) – 1:28
 "Playtime" (Stipe) – 2:02
 "Person" (Stipe) – 2:32

Furthermore What
 "Such N Such" (Stipe) – 2:05
 "Guru" (Stipe) – 3:03
 "Choukoutien" (Stipe) – 2:54
 "Straight" (Linda Hopper) – 2:24
 "Giddy Up" (Hopper) – 1:52
 "Elaine's Song" (Stipe) – 3:14

Live tracks
 "Random" (Stipe) – 1:25
 "Is It?" (Stipe) – 2:12
 "Whore Boy" (Ingrid Schorr) – 1:46
 "Round Is Funny" (Stipe) – 1:19
 "Let's Get Together" (Richard M. Sherman and Robert B. Sherman) – 1:46
 "Here We Go" (Stipe) – 1:47
 "Sunday Morning" (Hopper-Stipe) – 2:22
 "Down by the Beach" (Stipe) – 2:05
 "Shock (Sic Transit)" (Stipe) – 2:46
 "Lilting" (Stipe) – 2:04
 "Jumping" (Oh-OK, Stipe) – 1:35
 "Courage Courage" (Stipe) – 2:50
 "Psycho Killer" (David Byrne, Chris Frantz, and Tina Weymouth) – 1:52

Personnel 
Wow Mini Album
 Linda Hopper – vocals, noises
 David Pierce – drums
 Lynda Stipe – bass guitar, vocals

Furthermore What
 Linda Hopper – vocals
 David McNair – drums
 Lynda Stipe – bass guitar, vocals
 Matthew Sweet – guitar

"Random"
Recorded for the various artists compilation Squares Blot Out the Sun in November 1982 at 688 in Atlanta, Georgia
 Linda Hopper – vocals
 David Pierce – drums
 Lynda Stipe – bass guitar, vocals

Remaining live set
Recorded April 6, 1984 in Atlanta
 Linda Hopper – vocals
 David McNair – drums
 Lynda Stipe – bass guitar, vocals
 Matthew Sweet – guitar

Other personnel
 Robert Christgau and Carola Dibbell – liner notes

References

External links 
 Liner notes

2002 compilation albums
Matthew Sweet albums
Oh-OK albums
Compilation albums published posthumously
Albums produced by Michael Stipe
Collectors' Choice Music compilation albums